Discovery Real Time was a French television channel broadcasting lifestyle programmes about decorating, fashion, cooking and similar topics. It primarily targeted women.

The channel was launched in October 2005 and was the second Discovery network to launch in France. On 3 March 2009 the channel adopted a new logo and a new look designed to be "fresh and stimulating".

After the channel was dropped by leading satellite distributor Canalsat, Discovery decided to close it down. Transmissions ended on 26 January 2010 and was replaced by Discovery HD Showcase.

Programming
The channel used to broadcast both foreign programmes and a few original French productions. Most acquired programmes were originally produced for the American TLC or the British Channel 4. Programmes included:
10 Years Younger (Dix ans de moins)
A Baby Story (Histoire d'une naissance)
Baby's Room (La chambre de bebe)
Château Monty
Colin and Justin on the Estate (La banlieue des deco boys)
Crimes That Shook the World (Ces crimes qui ont marque le monde)
Dietbusters (Ex XL)
Faites comme chez eux
Flip That House (Mon pari immobilier)
Grand Designs (Bâtir son reve)
Groomer Has It (Toilettage Academy)
In a Fix (Mission renovation)
It's Me or the Dog (C'est le chien ou moi !)
La Maison Real Time
LA Ink
Le Restaurant
Miami Ink
Property Ladder (L'ascenseur immobilier)
Take Home Handyman (Mon coach brico)
Tous proprios !
Trauma: Life in the E.R. (Chroniques des urgences)
While You Were Out  (En votre absence)

References

External links

Warner Bros. Discovery networks
Television stations in France
Defunct television channels in France
Television channels and stations established in 2005
Television channels and stations disestablished in 2010